The Technotic Effect: A Hard Techno Compilation is a various artists compilation album released on March 26, 1993 by Re-Constriction Records. Aiding & Abetting gave it a positive review, calling the album "adventurous listening for the uninitiated" that "dares to bare a little emotion (see the X Marks the Pedwalk track) and ventures towards industrial territory."

Track listing

Personnel
Adapted from the liner notes of The Technotic Effect: A Hard Techno Compilation.
 Andreas Tomalla – compiling

Release history

References

External links 
 The Technotic Effect at Discogs (list of releases)

1993 compilation albums
Industrial compilation albums
Techno compilation albums
Re-Constriction Records compilation albums